Parasitidae is a family of predatory mites in the order Mesostigmata that has worldwide distribution. They are the only family in the superfamily Parasitoidea. Relatively large for mites, their color is often yellowish to dark brown. The family as a whole preys on a wide variety of microarthropods and nematodes, with individual species usually having a narrower range of prey. The family contains two subfamilies, 29 genera, and around 400 species.

The subfamily Pergamasinae is normally found in the soil, and dispersal via phoresy is not known in this subfamily. It contains 9 genera. Most species are bisexual.

The subfamily Parasitinae is normally found in nests of small animals or insects or in decaying organic matter, from seaweed to forest litter. This subfamily contains 20 genera. These mites disperse via phoresy in the deuteronymph stage of their life cycle. The genus Parasitellus is associated with bumblebees, and other genus with other bees, leading to the common name "bee mites". Other genera disperse on various beetles, e.g. Poecilochirus on burying beetles, leading to the name "beetle mites" which is also shared with the order of mites Oribatida, who have the name for a different reason.

Taxonomy
Parasitidae contains three taxonomic groups – two subfamilies and a group of genera not yet placed:

Subfamily Parasitinae Oudemans, 1901
 Gamasodes Oudemans, 1939
 Nemnichia Oudemans, 1936
 Oocarpais Berlese, 1916
 Parasitellus Willmann, 1939
 Parasitus Latreille, 1795
 Poecilochirus G. Canestrini & R. Canestrini, 1882
 Porrhostaspis Mueller, 1859
 Trachygamasus Berlese, 1906
 Willmanniella Götz, 1969

Subfamily Pergamasinae Juvara-Bals, 1976
 Cycetogamasus C. Athias-Henriot, 1980
 Heteroparasitus Juvara-Bals, 1976
 Holoparasitus Oudemans, 1936
 Ologamasiphis Holzmann, 1969
 Pergamasus Berlese, 1903

Incertae sedis
 Aclerogamasus Athias, 1971
 Anadenosternum C. Athias-Henriot, 1980
 Carpaidion C. Athias-Henriot, 1979
 Colpothylax C. Athias-Henriot, 1980
 Cornigamasus G. O. Evans & W. M. Till, 1979
 Dicrogamasus C. Athias-Henriot, 1980
 Erithosoma C. Athias-Henriot, 1979
 Leptogamasus Trägårdh, 1936
 Mixogamasus Juvara-Bals, 1972
 Paracarpais C. Athias-Henriot, 1978
 Pergamasellus Evans, 1957
 Phityogamasus Juvara-Bals & Athias-Henriot, 1972
 Phorytocarpais C. Athias-Henriot, 1979
 Psilogamasus Athias-Henriot, 1969
 Rhabdocarpais C. Athias-Henriot, 1981
 Schizosthetus C. Athias-Henriot, 1982
 Taiwanoparasitus Tseng, 1995
 Zelogamasus M. K. Hennessey & M. H. Farrier, 1989

References

External links
Bugguide at Iowa State University

 
Mesostigmata
Taxa named by Anthonie Cornelis Oudemans
Acari families